Jēkabs Rēdlihs (born March 29, 1982) is a Latvian ice hockey Defender currently playing for HK Kurbads in the Latvian Hockey League (LHL).

Playing career
Rēdlihs was selected in the fourth round 119th overall by the Columbus Blue Jackets in the 2002 NHL Entry Draft. Drafted from the New York Applecore of the EJHL, Rēdlihs then enrolled with Boston University of the Hockey East and completed a four-collegiate career with the Terriers earning Hockey East All-Rookie honors in his freshman year.

After his 2005–06 senior season with the Hockey East champions, Rēdlihs made his professional debut when he signed an ATO contract with the Blue Jackets affiliate, the Syracuse Crunch of the AHL on March 30, 2006.

Un-signed by Columbus, Rēdlihs was invited to the Blue Jackets training camp for the 2006–07 season but was then reassigned to play with the Syracuse Crunch and second tier affiliate, the Dayton Bombers of the ECHL. He was again invited to the Blue Jackets 2007–08 training camp on September 10, 2007, but was later released to the Crunch on September 20, 2007.

After spending the majority of the season with the Elmira Jackals of the ECHL, Rēdlihs left North America when he signed with HC Plzeň of the Czech Extraliga on January 9, 2008. Helping to strengthen 1929's defense, he was then re-signed to a one-year contract for the 2008–09 season on March 31, 2008.

On July 17, 2009, Rēdlihs, a free agent, signed a two-year contract with Dinamo Riga of the KHL.

On June 1, 2015, Rēdlihs continued his career in the Czech Extraliga in signing with Piráti Chomutov after one season with HC Karlovy Vary.

Personal
Jēkabs Rēdlihs has three brothers. Two of them, Miķelis Rēdlihs and Krišjānis Rēdlihs, are hockey players. All three brothers have appeared together in Latvia national team.

Career statistics

Regular season and playoffs

International

Awards and honors

References

External links
 

1982 births
Boston University Terriers men's ice hockey players
Columbus Blue Jackets draft picks
Dayton Bombers players
Dinamo Riga players
Elmira Jackals (ECHL) players
HC Karlovy Vary players
HC Plzeň players
HK Riga 2000 players
Latvian ice hockey defencemen
Living people
Modo Hockey players
Piráti Chomutov players
Ice hockey people from Riga
Syracuse Crunch players
Latvian expatriate sportspeople in the United States
Latvian expatriate sportspeople in the Czech Republic
Latvian expatriate sportspeople in Sweden
Expatriate ice hockey players in Sweden
Expatriate ice hockey players in the Czech Republic
Expatriate ice hockey players in the United States
Latvian expatriate ice hockey people
HK Liepājas Metalurgs players